is an international school located in Onocho, Kanagawa-ku, Yokohama, Kanagawa prefecture, Japan. It educates students from preschool to high school – ages two and a half to eighteen – under the IB Diploma Programme.

History

Curriculum

See also
 List of junior high schools in Kanagawa Prefecture
 List of elementary schools in Kanagawa Prefecture

References

International schools in Yokohama
High schools in Yokohama
International Baccalaureate schools in Japan
Educational institutions established in 2003
Elementary schools in Japan
2003 establishments in Japan